Third-person shooter (TPS) is a genre of 3D action video game in which the player character is visible on-screen, and the gameplay consists primarily of shooting.



Legend

List

See also 

 Third-person shooter

References 

 
Third-person shooters